The following properties located in Quincy, Massachusetts are listed on the National Register of Historic Places.

Current listings

|}

References

Tourist attractions in Quincy, Massachusetts
Quincy
 
Quincy, Massachusetts